Vatutino is a rural locality (a selo) in Valuysky District, Belgorod Oblast, Russia. The population was 27 as of 2010. There is 1 street.

Geography 
Vatutino is located 23 km northeast of Valuyki (the district's administrative centre) by road. Voronovka is the nearest rural locality.

References 

Rural localities in Valuysky District
Valuysky Uyezd